Lee Chul-Hee (born August 6, 1985) is a South Korean football player who since 2007 has played for Icheon Citizen FC. His previous club is Daejeon Citizen in South Korea and Yanbian FC in China PR.

References

1985 births
Living people
South Korean footballers
Expatriate footballers in China
China League One players
Yanbian Funde F.C. players
South Korean expatriate sportspeople in China
Association football midfielders